Rivière Saint-Maurice (Aviation Maurice) Water Aerodrome, formerly , is a defunct aerodrome that was located on Saint-Maurice River, Quebec, Canada.

References

Airports in Mauricie
Defunct seaplane bases in Quebec